The year 1667 in music involved some significant events.

Events 
January 27 – First performance at the Opernhaus am Taschenberg, the court opera house of the Elector of Saxony in Dresden designed by Wolf Caspar von Klengel, Giovanni Andrea Moneglia's Il teseo.
Marc-Antoine Charpentier arrives in Rome.
Antonio Stradivari makes the Aranyi violin.
Cristofaro Caresana becomes an organist and singer in the Chapel Royal and director of the Neapolitan Conservatorio di Sant'Onofrio a Porta Capuana.

Classical music 
Samuel Capricornus – Sonata à 8 in A minor
Johann Heinrich Schmelzer – Arie per il balletto à cavallo
John Weldon – The Tempest incidental music for the staged production that opened on 7 November

Publications 
Giovanni Bononcini – Cantatas, I-MOe Mus.F.1379
Maurizio Cazzati – Canzonette a voce sola, libro 4, Op.43
Paul Gerhardt – Geistliche Andachten, a collection of hymns, published in Berlin
Adam Krieger – Arien, vol. 2
Giovanni Legrenzi – Sacri e festivi concenti, Op.9
Guillaume-Gabriel Nivers 
2e livre d'orgue contenant la messe et les hymnes de l'église, organ collection
Traité de la composition de musique
Esaias Reusner – Delitiae Testudinis
Giovanni Battista Vitali – Op. 2, a collection of sonatas
7 Cantatas, I-MOe Mus.F.1361 (Various composers including a 7-year old Scarlatti)

Opera
Antonio Cesti – Il pomo d'oro
Antonio Draghi – Vero amore fa soave ogni fatica
Carlo Pallavicino – Il Meraspe

Births 
January 5 – Antonio Lotti, composer (died 1740)
February 5 – Gottfried Reiche, composer (died 1734)
February 21 – Bartholomäus Crasselius, hymnist (died 1724)
April 29 – John Arbuthnot, polymath, poet, and librettist (died 1735)
July 16 – Giuseppe Maria Jacchini, cellist and composer (died 1727)
September 24 – Jean-Louis Lully, musician and composer, son of Jean-Baptiste Lully (died 1688)
December 4 – Michel Pignolet de Montéclair, composer (died 1737)
December 15 
Floriano Arresti (French), Italian composer (died 1717)
Ernest Louis, composer and landgrave (died 1739)
December 18 – Wenzel Ludwig von Radolt, composer (died 1716)
date unknown
Johann Christoph Pepusch, composer (died 1752)

Deaths 
February 6 – Giovanni Martino Cesare, cornet player and composer (born c.1590)
May 2 – George Wither, librettist, poet, and hymn composer (born 1588)
May 7 – Johann Jakob Froberger, organist and composer (born 1616)
May 18 – Melchior Schildt, composer and organist (born 1592 or 93)
June 18 – Luise Henriette von Oranien, lyricist (born 1627)
July – Francesco Manelli, composer (born 1594)
August 31 – Johann Rist, poet who authored many hymns (born 1607)
November 5 – Franz Tunder, composer (born 1614)
November 16 – Nathanael Schnittelbach, composer (born 1633)
date unknown – Johann Schop, violinist and composer (born c.1590)

References